OVÖ (Om Vi Överlever), are a Swedish hiphop-duo that was created in 2017 by rappers Nicky Csenius and Jaculi Akofely.

The duo participated in Melodifestivalen 2020 with the song "Inga problem".

Discography

Singles

References

External links 

Musical groups established in 2017
2017 establishments in Sweden
Melodifestivalen contestants of 2020